United Nations Security Council resolution 450, adopted on 14 June 1979, after recalling resolutions 425 (1978), 426 (1978), 427 (1978), 434 (1978) and 444 (1979) and considering the report from the Secretary-General on the United Nations Interim Force in Lebanon (UNIFIL), the Council condemned attacks by Israel against Lebanon that had displaced civilians, caused deaths and destruction. It called on Israel to cease its actions against the country.

The Council then reiterated the objectives of the Force, set out in resolutions 425, 426 and 444 which must be attained. The resolution commended the work of UNIFIL, adding that it must enjoy freedom of movement and communications to implement the resolution. It also reaffirmed the validity of the General Armistice Agreement between Israel and Lebanon, calling on both parties to reactivate the Mixed Armistice Commissions, and extended the mandate of UNIFIL until 19 December 1979.

The resolution was adopted by 12 votes to none, while Czechoslovakia and the Soviet Union abstained, and China did not participate.

See also
 Blue Line
 Israel–Lebanon conflict
 List of United Nations Security Council Resolutions 401 to 500 (1976–1982)

References
Text of Resolution at Wikisource.org

External links
 

 0450
Israeli–Lebanese conflict
 0450
1979 in Israel
1979 in Lebanon
 0450
June 1979 events